The 23rd Lambda Literary Awards were held in 2011, to honour works of LGBT literature published in 2010.

Beginning with the 2011 awards, the Lambda Literary Foundation took over the administration and presentation of the Jim Duggins Outstanding Mid-Career Novelists' Prize, formerly a program of the Saints and Sinners Literary Festival.

Special awards

Nominees and winners

External links
 23rd Lambda Literary Awards 

Lambda Literary Awards
Lambda
Lists of LGBT-related award winners and nominees
2011 in LGBT history
2011 awards in the United States